The  Tri-Cities Fever season was the team's twelfth season as a professional indoor football franchise and seventh in the Indoor Football League (IFL). One of ten teams that compete in the IFL for the 2016 season, the Fever are members of the Intense Conference.

Under the leadership of owner/general manager Teri Carr and head coach Adam Shackleford, the team played their home games at the Toyota Center in Kennewick, Washington.

Schedule
Key:

Regular season
All start times are local time

Standings

Roster

References

External links
Tri-Cities Fever official statistics

Tri-Cities Fever
Tri-Cities Fever seasons
Tri-Cities Fever